Captain Moses Allen was the first settler in Hillsdale County, located in the south central portion of the U.S. State of Michigan.

Moses Allen was a veteran of the War of 1812; he later served as a captain in the Michigan Militia. He became the first "white settler" in present-day Hillsdale County. He settled in April 1827, two years after working on the Chicago Turnpike survey. (present-day US-12)

References

External links 
Hillsdale County Community Center http://www.hillsdalecounty.info/history0013.asp
Monroe House http://www.munrohouse.com/local_history.html
Hillsdale County Website https://web.archive.org/web/20080607054622/http://www.co.hillsdale.mi.us/hc-history.htm

People from Hillsdale County, Michigan
1827 in Michigan Territory
19th century in Michigan
American military personnel of the War of 1812
Military personnel from Michigan